HD 43691 is a G-type star with magnitude +8.03 located approximately 280 light-years away in the constellation Auriga. This yellow star is about to stop thermonuclear hydrogen-fusion in its core and eventually expand to become a red giant.

Planetary system
In July 2007, the star is found to have a giant planet in orbit around it. It has minimum mass two and a half times that of Jupiter and orbits the star closer than Mercury to the Sun.

See also
 List of extrasolar planets

References

External links

 

Auriga (constellation)
G-type main-sequence stars
G-type subgiants
043691
030057
Planetary systems with one confirmed planet
Durchmusterung objects